Alfredo Welby (16 December 1910 – 14 July 1998) was an Italian professional footballer who played for AS Roma, Reggina, Cosenza and MATER.

He was the father of right-to-die activist Piergiorgio Welby. He was of Scottish origin.

1910 births
1998 deaths
Italian footballers
A.S. Roma players
Reggina 1914 players
Italian people of Scottish descent
Association football midfielders